Thomas Wallis Kelynack (1868 – 16 November 1936) was a leading Melbourne journalist/police roundsman in the early 20th century, especially noted for his extensive, authoritative, and well-regarded sports journalism in The Herald of Melbourne  especially in relation to Australian rules football and cricket  published under the nom de guerre of "Kickero".

Family
The son of Charles Kelynack (1825-1894), and Jane Kelynack (1830-1890), née Wallis, Thomas Wallis Kelynack was born at Long Gully, Bendigo, Victoria, in 1868.

He married Catherine Mary Smith (1864-1928) in 1891; they had five children.

Journalist
He joined The Herald in 1889  following his earlier press experience in Bendigo and Broken Hill  and he retired from The Herald, and from journalism, in 1930.

Death
He died at his residence at Moreland, Victoria, on 16 November 1936.

Notes

References
 Photograph of T.W. Kelynack reporting his final football match: the 1930 Grand Final, Melbourne Cricket Ground, Registration No.1992.2558.2, collection of the Australian Gallery of Sport and Olympic Museum.
 Educational: Brunswick College: Pupils' Success, The Brunswick and Coburg Star, (Friday, 13 March 1914), p.1.
 Brunswick College Student's Promotion, The Brunswick and Coburg Leader, (Friday, 5 October 1917), p.2. 
 Military Cross Won, The Weekly Times, (Saturday, 10 November 1917), p.23.

1868 births
1936 deaths
Journalists from Melbourne
Australian sports journalists
Crime journalists
Reuters people